The Central Eastern Marine Park (formerly known as the Central Eastern Commonwealth Marine Reserve) is an Australian marine park that extends from the edge of the continental shelf, offshore of New South Wales and  from Coffs Harbour, to about  offshore into deep ocean waters. It incorporates the waters above most of the southern portion of the Tasmantid Seamount Chain. It is one of 8 parks managed under the Temperate East Marine Parks Network.

Conservation values

Species and habitat
Biologically important areas for the protected humpback whale, vulnerable white shark and a number of migratory seabirds.
Represents seafloor features including: abyssal plain/deep ocean floor, canyon, pinnacle, slope, knoll/abyssal-hills/hills/mountains/peak, and seamount/guyot.

Bioregions and ecology
Examples of the ecosystems of the Central Eastern Province, Central Eastern Shelf Transition, and Tasman Basin Province provincial bioregions and the Tweed-Moreton meso-scale bioregion.
Canyons on the eastern continental slope (part of one of three shelf-incising canyons occurring in the region is represented).
Tasmantid Seamount Chain (known breeding and feeding areas for a number of open ocean species such as billfish and marine mammals).

History
The marine park was proclaimed under the EPBC Act on 14 December 2013 and renamed Central Eastern Marine Park on 9 October 2017. The management plan and protection measures of the marine park came into effect for the first time on 1 July 2018.

Summary of protection zones
The Central Eastern Marine Park has been assigned IUCN protected area category IV. However, within the marine park there are three protection zones, each zone has an IUCN category and related rules for managing activities to ensure the protection of marine habitats and species.

The following table is a summary of the zoning rules within the Central Eastern Marine Park:

See also

 Protected areas managed by the Australian government

References

External links
 Temperate East Marine Parks Network - Parks Australia
 Temperate East Marine Parks Network - environment.gov.au (outdated)

Australian marine parks